A Different Drummer or Different Drummer may refer to:

 A Different Drummer (album), a 1971 album by Buddy Rich
 A Different Drummer (novel), a 1962 novel by William Melvin Kelley
 Different Drummer (album), a 1987 album by Isley-Jasper-Isley
 Different Drummer (ballet), a 1984 ballet created by Kenneth MacMillan
 Different Drummers, a 2013 American film